The Franklin 2  series of American two-cylinder air-cooled horizontally opposed aircraft engines were produced in the 1930s and 1940s.

Variants
Data from:

O-110
2A4-45 at 2,650rpm
2A4-49 at 3,000rpm
2A-110 at 3,000rpm
2AL-112 alternative designation of the 2A4-45
PZL-F2A The Franklin 2 series produced under licence in Poland

O-120
2A-120 at 3,200rpm
PZL-F2A-120-C1Production in Poland of the 2A-120

Applications
Data from: 
Bellanca 7ACA Champion
Lockheed Little Dipper
PZL-126 Mrówka
Sportavia RF 5S
VTC SSV-17
Wallis WA-116/F
Wallis WA-121/F
WSK-PZL Krosno KR-02 Krokodyl
PZL SZD-45-2 Ogar

See also

Notes

References

Further reading
 Gunston, Bill. (1986) World Encyclopedia of Aero Engines. Patrick Stephens: Wellingborough. p. 57

Boxer engines
1930s aircraft piston engines
Franklin aircraft engines